Espen Stueland (born 30 May 1970) is a Norwegian poet, novelist, literary critic and essayist. He hails from Porsgrunn, but lives in Vossevangen.

Among his books are the novel Kjærlighet i tide og utide (2001), and the poetry collection Å si om seg selv (2003).

He received the Halldis Moren Vesaas Prize in 2003.

References

1970 births
Living people
21st-century Norwegian poets
Norwegian male poets
20th-century Norwegian novelists
21st-century Norwegian novelists
Norwegian essayists
Norwegian literary critics
People from Porsgrunn
Norwegian male novelists
Male essayists
20th-century essayists
21st-century essayists
20th-century Norwegian male writers
21st-century Norwegian male writers